Seven Springs may refer to:

Places
In England
 Seven Springs, Gloucestershire, a spring and hamlet, and one possible source of the River Thames

In the United States
 Seven Springs, Pennsylvania 
 Seven Springs Mountain Resort
 Seven Springs, North Carolina
 Seven Springs (Enfield, Virginia), a historic home
 Seven Springs (Bedford, New York), a residence owned by Donald Trump

Other uses
 Seven Springs (restaurant), a South Korean restaurant chain